Gramada (Serbian Cyrillic: Грамада or Црквена планина) is a mountain in southeastern Serbia, north of the Vlasina heights and Vlasina Lake. Its highest peak Vrtop has an elevation of 1,721 meters above sea level.

References

Mountains of Serbia
Rhodope mountain range